Margita (Serbian Cyrillic: Маргита) is a village in Serbia. It is situated in the Plandište municipality, in the South Banat District, Vojvodina province. The population of the village numbering 1,047 people (2002 census). Village is ethnically mixed and its population include 462 Serbs (44,12%), 303 Romanians (28,93%), 107 Romani (10,21%), 100 Hungarians (9,55%), and others.

Name

In Serbian the village is known as Margita (Маргита), in Romanian as Mărghita, in Hungarian as Nagymargita, and in German as Groß Margit.

Historical population

1961: 1,998
1971: 1,827
1981: 1,550
1991: 1,313
2002: 1,047

References
Slobodan Ćurčić, Broj stanovnika Vojvodine, Novi Sad, 1996.

See also
List of places in Serbia
List of cities, towns and villages in Vojvodina

Populated places in Serbian Banat
Populated places in South Banat District
Plandište